A Lazarus Taxon is a box set by Chicago post-rock group Tortoise, released in 2006 on Thrill Jockey.

Release
The set contains three CDs, one DVD and an accompanying 20-page booklet. The CDs contain 33 tracks of hard-to-find material from tour, compilation and non-American releases. The band's out of print 1995 album Rhythms, Resolutions & Clusters, compiled of remixes by friends of the band including Steve Albini, Rick Brown, Jim O'Rourke and Brad Wood features as well. Also in the set is other previously unreleased material including a restored remix by the Minutemen's Mike Watt that was delivered too late for inclusion on Rhythms... and subsequently fell victim to a malfunctioning DAT machine. Tortoise bassist Bundy K Brown himself restored the tape, twelve years after it was recorded. The DVD contains most of the band's music videos as well as over two hours of "extensive and rare" live performance footage. The set was compiled by the band themselves.

The set's title is derived from the palaeontological term "lazarus taxon", meaning a taxon (or grouping of organisms) that disappears from the fossil record only to reappear again at a later point, which in turn refers back to the resurrection of Lazarus by Jesus in the New Testament.

Track listing
All tracks written by Tortoise except where noted.

Disc 1 (CD)
"Gamera" – 11:53
"The Source of Uncertainty" – 3:42
"Blackbird" – 5:01
"Sexual for Elizabeth" (Shingo Annen/Dan Bitney/John Herndon/Patrick Johnson/Jon Marshall/Doug McCombs/John McEntire/Jeff Parker) – 4:49
Tortoise remix of "Sexual for Elizabeth" by Five Deez
"To Day Retrieval" – 3:58
Autechre remix of "Ten-Day Interval" 
"Whitewater" (John McEntire) – 5:07
"Didjeridoo" (Duke Ellington) – 4:33
Tortoise cover version of a Duke Ellington piece
"Autumn Sweater" (Georgia Hubley/Ira Kaplan/James McNew) – 7:07
Tortoise cover version of a Yo La Tengo song
"Wait" (Jeff Parker) – 4:27
"A Grape Dope" – 4:12
"Restless Waters" – 3:41
"Vaus" – 5:01
"Blue Station" (Doug McCombs/Curtis Roads) – 5:34

Disc 2 (CD)
"Madison Area" – 3:27
"TNT" – 10:03
Nobukazu Takemura remix
"Why We Fight" – 4:23
"Elmerson, Lincoln, and Palmieri" – 2:39
"Peering" – 5:11
"Goriri" – 6:40
"As You Said" (Ian Curtis/Bernard Sumner/Peter Hook/Steve Morris) – 4:21
 Tortoise cover version of a Joy Division song
"CTA" – 5:07
"Deltitnu" – 5:50
"Adverse Camber" – 6:00
A different Autechre remix of "Ten-Day Interval"
"Cliff Dweller Society" (Dan Bitney/Bundy K. Brown/Dan Fliegel/John Herndon/Doug McCombs/John McEntire) – 15:23
"Waihopai" – 4:13

Disc 3 (CD)
Tracks 1-7 previously issued as Rhythms, Resolutions & Clusters (1995).
"Alcohall" – 4:03
John McEntire remix of "On Noble"
"Your New Rod" – 4:18
Rick Brown remix of "Flyrod"
"Cobwebbed" – 4:38
Casey Rice remix of "Spiderwebbed"
"The Match Incident" – 5:31
Steve Albini remix of "Ry Cooder"
"Tin Can Puerto Rican Remix" – 4:24
Brad Wood remix of "Tin Cans and Twine"
"Not Quite East of the Ryan" – 5:08
Bundy K. Brown remix of "Spiderwebbed" plus elements from other tracks
"Initial Gesture Protraction" – 4:47
Jim O'Rourke remix of "His Second Story Island"
"Cornpone Brunch Watt Remix" – 4:18
Mike Watt remix of "Cornpone Brunch" featuring extra bass guitars by Mike Watt and Kira Roeseler
"Jetty_99" – 5:48
iTunes bonus track

Disc 4 (DVD)
"Salt the Skies" (video)
"Dear Grandma and Grandpa" (video)
"Glass Museum" (video)
"Seneca" (video)
"Four Day Interval" (video)
"The Suspension Bridge at Iguazú Falls" (video)
"Monica" (video)
Live at Primavera Sound, 2005
"Gamera"/"Glass Museum"/"Reservoir"/"Djed"/"The Equator"/"Vaus"/"Cornpone Brunch"
Live in Toronto, 1996
"Ten Day Interval"/"Othello"
Live at Deutsches Jazz Festival, 1999
"Seneca"
Live on "Chic-a-Go-Go", 2005
"Salt the Skies"
Live for "Burn to Shine", 2004

Personnel

Performance

Dan Bitney
Bundy K. Brown
John Herndon
Doug McCombs
John McEntire

David Pajo – guitar
Jeff Parker
Kira Roessler – bass guitar
Shing02 – rapping

Production

Steve Albini – production
Sean Booth – remixing
Rick Brown – remixing
Rob Brown – remixing
Brendan Canty – remixing
Dan Fliegel – composer
Lenny Golzalez – photography
Baldomero Gordillo – liner notes
Christopher Green – direction
Georgia Hubley – composer
Fat Jon – composer, lyrics
Ira Kaplan – composer
Alan Licht – liner notes

James McNew – composer
Arnold Odermatt – cover art, photography, sleeve photo
Jim O'Rourke – remixing
Pace Rock – composer, lyrics
Andrew Paynter – photography
Marty Perez – photography
Casey Rice – remixing
Sheila Sachs – design
Nobukazu Takemura – remixing
Saverio Truglia – photography
Mike Watt – remixing
Julian Weber – liner notes
Brad Wood – remixing

Charts

References

External links
 
 A Lazarus Taxon at Thrill Jockey

2006 compilation albums
2006 live albums
2006 video albums
Tortoise (band) albums
Thrill Jockey compilation albums
Thrill Jockey video albums
Music video compilation albums
Live video albums